William Joseph Hockin (born 30 September 1938) is an Anglican priest and author.

Educated at Wilfrid Laurier University and ordained in 1963, he was a curate at All Saints, Windsor until 1966. He then served the parishes of All Saints, Waterloo, St John Tillsonburg  and St George London. He was Archdeacon of Middlesex from 1984 to 1986 and then Rector of  St Paul's Toronto for a decade. He was Dean of Fredericton from 1996 to 1998 when he was elected Coadjutor Bishop of Fredericton. He became the seventh Diocesan Bishop of Fredericton in 2000, serving for three years.

Notes

External links
Bill Hockin Ministries

1938 births
Wilfrid Laurier University alumni
Anglican Church of Canada archdeacons
Deans of Fredericton
Anglican bishops of Fredericton
20th-century Anglican Church of Canada bishops
21st-century Anglican Church of Canada bishops
Living people